The 1997–98 Tampa Bay Lightning season was the Lightning's sixth season of operation. The Lightning missed the playoffs for the second consecutive year.

Offseason

Regular season

The Lightning struggled offensively during the regular season, being shut out a league-high 11 times (tied with the Chicago Blackhawks and the Mighty Ducks of Anaheim) and finishing 26th in goals scored (151), power-play goals scored (33) and power-play percentage (9.35%). The 9.35% power play was the lowest in NHL history in one season by any team until the 2020-21 Anaheim Ducks surpassed it with an 8.94% power play efficiency.

Final standings

Game log

Player stats

Regular season
Scoring

Goaltending

Note: Pos = Position; GP = Games played; G = Goals; A = Assists; Pts = Points; +/- = plus/minus; PIM = Penalty minutes; PPG = Power-play goals; SHG = Short-handed goals; GWG = Game-winning goals
MIN = Minutes played; W = Wins; L = Losses; T = Ties; GA = Goals-against; GAA = Goals-against average; SO = Shutouts; SA = Shots against; SV = Shots saved; SV% = Save percentage;

Awards and records

Transactions

Draft picks
Tampa Bay's draft picks at the 1997 NHL Entry Draft held at the Civic Arena in Pittsburgh, Pennsylvania.

See also
1997–98 NHL season

References
 

T
T
Tampa Bay Lightning seasons
Tamp
Tamp